Zohra Ez-Zahraoui (born 18 November 1983) is a Moroccan female boxer.

She competed at the 2016 Summer Olympics in Rio de Janeiro, in the women's flyweight.

She competed at the 2016 AIBA Women's World Boxing Championships, where she won her first match against Nesthy Petecio, and was defeated by eventual silver medalist Peamwilai Laopeam in the second round.

References

1983 births
Living people
Moroccan women boxers
Olympic boxers of Morocco
Boxers at the 2016 Summer Olympics
Flyweight boxers